Mother of All Saints is an album by the American band Thinking Fellers Union Local 282. It was released in 1992 through Matador Records. The band supported the album by playing shows with Bailter Space.

Critical reception

The Chicago Tribune deemed the album "a sprawling, 23-song, 70-minute heap of fragmented melodies, noise and roundabout backwoods ruralism." The Gainesville Sun praised the "staggering epic weirdness."

Track listing

Personnel 
Thinking Fellers Union Local 282
Mark Davies – guitar, bass guitar, banjo, percussion, French horn, organ, vocals
Anne Eickelberg – bass guitar, percussion, vocals
Brian Hageman – guitar, erhu, viola, mandolin, tape, percussion, vocals
Jay Paget – drums, vocals
Hugh Swarts – guitar, piano, percussion, vocals
Production and additional personnel
Paul Bergmann – drums on "Tight Little Thing"
Gail Butensky – photography
Kim Campisano – photography
John Frentress – harmonica on "1" Tall"
Greg Freeman – production, engineering
Bren't Lewiis – tape on "Tell Me"
Thinking Fellers Union Local 282 – production

References

External links 
 

1992 albums
Matador Records albums
Thinking Fellers Union Local 282 albums